Wildcat Mountain Ski Area is a ski area located on Wildcat Mountain near Jackson, New Hampshire, United States, in the Mount Washington Valley.

Wildcat is one of the best-known alpine skiing resorts in New England, with lifts from the base on NH Rt. 16 in Pinkham Notch  up to the summit ridge.

History
Wildcat is home to one of the oldest ski-racing trails in the United States. The original trail was built in 1933 by the Civilian Conservation Corps.

Wildcat was the first ski area to have a gondola lift, which opened on January 25, 1958. The lift has since been replaced with a Doppelmayr high-speed chairlift known as the "Wildcat Express", but gondola carriers are still used for summer scenic operations.

As a result, the ski and snowboard season generally lasts from mid-November through early May.

In recent years, Wildcat has worked to improve its summer and fall activities.  In addition to replacing the aging gondola lift with a new high-speed chairlift (which is converted to a gondola during the summer and fall), the area has added a zip line, served by a triple chairlift.

The resort was acquired in 1986 by Pat Franchi and family. In October 2010, they signed a deal to sell the ski area to Peak Resorts subject to approval by the U.S. Forest Service which owns the underlying land. The new operators decided to not honor lifetime passes sold under previous ownership, resulting in possible legal action.

In 2019, Wildcat and its sister resort, Attitash (in the town of Bartlett), were purchased by Vail Resorts. Tickets are good at both mountain regardless of where they are bought.  The Epic Pass can be used at these and all other ski areas operated by Vail Resorts.

References

External links
 Wildcat Mountain Ski Area official site
 Wildcat Mountain - New England's Alpine CCC Ski Trails

Buildings and structures in Coös County, New Hampshire
Ski areas and resorts in New Hampshire
Tourist attractions in Coös County, New Hampshire
Peak Resorts
Civilian Conservation Corps in New Hampshire